La Madeleine-de-Nonancourt (literally La Madeleine of Nonancourt) is a commune in the Eure department in Normandy in north-western France.

Population

See also
Communes of the Eure department

References

Communes of Eure